The German Classic Pony or  is a modern German breed of riding pony. It derives from the traditional Shetland Pony of the Scottish Shetland Isles, but is principally influenced by the taller and more elegant American Shetland Pony.

History 

From about 1965 breeders in Germany began to selectively breed the traditional Shetland Pony with the taller and more athletic American Shetland Pony, with the aim of creating a more elegant pony better suited to use for riding and driving. The 1961 American champion stallion Jiggs was imported, together with several mares. In the 1990s the Shetland Pony Stud-Book Society declined to register any pony with American bloodlines; the name "Deutsche Shetland Partbred" was proposed for these ponies, but some breeders did not accept it. They formed their own breed society, and the Deutsches Classic-Pony was officially recognised as a German breed in 2001.

In 2007 the conservation status of the breed was listed by the FAO as "endangered".

Characteristics 

References